This article contains a list of current SNCF railway stations in the Brittany region of France.

Côtes-d'Armor (22)

 Belle-Isle-Bégard
 Brélidy-Plouëc
 Broons
 Callac
 Carnoët-Locarn
 Caulnes
 Châtelaudren-Plouagat
 Coat-Guégan
 Corseul-Languenan
 Dinan
 Frynaudour
 Gourland
 Guingamp
 La Hisse
 Lamballe
 Lancerf
 Landébia
 Lannion
 Les Mais
 La Méaugon
 Moustéru
 Paimpol
 Le Pénity
 Plancoët
 Plénée-Jugon
 Plestan
 Pleudihen
 Plouaret-Trégor
 Plougonver
 Plounérin
 Plouvara-Plerneuf
 Pont-Melvez
 Pontrieux
 Pontrieux (Halte)
 Saint-Brieuc
 Traou-Nez
 Trégonneau-Squiffiec
 Yffiniac

Finistère (29)

 Bannalec
 Brest
 Carhaix
 Châteaulin
 Dirinon-Loperhet
 La Forest
 Guimiliau
 Landerneau
 Landivisiau
 Morlaix
 Pleyber-Christ
 Plouigneau
 Pont-de-Buis
 Quimper
 Quimperlé
 La Roche-Maurice
 Roscoff
 Rosporden
 Saint-Pol-de-Léon
 Saint-Thégonnec

Ille-et-Vilaine (35)

 Betton
 Bonnemain
 Breteil
 La Brohinière
 Bruz
 Cesson-Sévigné
 Châteaubourg
 Chevaigné
 Combourg
 Corps-Nuds
 Dingé
 Dol-de-Bretagne
 Fougeray-Langon
 La Fresnais
 La Gouesnière-Cancale
 Guichen-Bourg-des-Comptes
 L'Hermitage-Mordelles
 Janzé
 Ker-Lann
 Les Lacs
 Laillé
 Martigné-Ferchaud
 Messac-Guipry
 Miniac
 Montauban-de-Bretagne
 Montfort-sur-Meu
 Montreuil-sur-Ille
 Noyal-Acigne
 Pléchatel
 Plerguer
 Quédillac
 Redon
 Rennes
 Rennes-Pontchaillou
 Rennes-La Poterie
 Retiers
 Saint-Armel
 Saint-Germain-sur-Ille
 Saint-Jacques-de-la-Lande
 Saint-Malo
 Saint-Médard-sur-Ille
 Saint-Senoux-Pléchatel
 Servon
 Le Theil-de-Bretagne
 Vern
 Vitré

Morbihan (56)

 Auray
 Belz-Ploemel
 Brandérion
 Gestel
 Hennebont
 L'Isthme
 Kerhostin
 Landaul-Mendon
 Landévant
 Lorient
 Malansac
 Penthièvre
 Plouharnel-Carnac
 Questembert
 Quiberon
 Les Sables-Blancs
 Sainte-Anne
 Saint-Pierre-Quiberon
 Vannes

See also
 SNCF 
 List of SNCF stations for SNCF stations in other regions

Brittany